Heterotheca camporum, known by the common name lemonyellow false goldenaster, is a North American species of flowering plant in the family Asteraceae. It is found only in the central United States, primarily the Ozarks, the Cumberland Plateau, and the middle Mississippi Valley. There are reports of additional populations in the Northeast, the Southeast, and in the Great Lakes region, but these appear to be waifs or naturalizations.

Heterotheca camporum is a perennial herb growing 150 centimeters (5 feet) in height, spreading by means of underground rhizomes. There can be as many as 100 stems from one clone. Each stem can produce 1-24 flower heads in flat-topped arrays Each head contains 16–38 ray florets surrounding 23–66 tiny disc florets at the center.

References

External links
Michigan Flora
Alabama Plant Atlas

camporum
Endemic flora of the United States
Plants described in 1896